Salvia leucocephala is a species of flowering plant in the family Lamiaceae that is native to Ecuador.
Its natural habitat is subtropical or tropical dry shrubland.

References

leucocephala
Flora of Ecuador
Vulnerable plants
Taxonomy articles created by Polbot